Jokers Wild is a British comedy panel game show that originally aired on ITV as a pilot on 15 April 1969 and then as a full series from 9 July 1969 to 20 November 1974. It was hosted by Barry Cryer. The show was based on two American panel game shows: Stop Me If You've Heard This One and Can You Top This?.

Format and performers
Each week two teams of three comedians each played for points by telling jokes on a certain subject chosen by the host, who would pull the selection from a box on his desk. Typical examples were politics or the mother-in-law. When a member of a team was telling a joke, a member of the other team could interrupt the joke by pressing the buzzer and finishing the joke to score bonus points for his/her team.  The turn did not end, however, until the comedian whose proper turn it was finished a joke with a punchline.

Before the commercial break one of the comedians would be given one minute to get as many laughs as possible from the studio audience. The more laughs, the more points were scored. At the end of the show the team with the most points won a gag trophy of a jester carrying the Yorkshire Television chevron logo.

In each team of three, two of the comedians were regular contestants; the third was a guest comedian. Guest comedians regularly appeared for two shows in succession before new guests appeared. For much of the run of the series, Ted Ray and Arthur Askey served as team captains, usually regularly supported by Ray Martine and Les Dawson respectively. Some of the other comedians who appeared on the show, either as guests or as temporary team captains or regular contestants, were Jon Pertwee, John Cleese, Rolf Harris, Ted Rogers, Norman Collier, Chic Murray, Alfred Marks, Lance Percival, Charlie Chester, Tim Brooke-Taylor and Jack Douglas. Series co-creator, and father of comic Michael McIntyre, Ray Cameron, appeared as a panellist on several episodes in the first series.

In the first series, compère Barry Cryer was joined by an assistant, although her role in the show was very limited and the idea of an assistant was dropped after a handful of episodes. Points were awarded on an arbitrary basis by Cryer (sometimes with help from the studio audience). In early series, jokes scored either five or ten points each. In later series, any number of points up to ten could be awarded. The system of points scoring was, by and large, not a major factor in the show in any case, but simply a way to suggest competitiveness between the comedians.

Transmissions

Series

Specials

DVD releases
The first two series of Jokers Wild have been released on DVD by Network.

External links

1969 British television series debuts
1974 British television series endings
1960s British game shows
1970s British game shows
ITV panel games
Television series by ITV Studios
Television series by Yorkshire Television
English-language television shows
1960s British comedy television series
1970s British comedy television series